The 2022–23 season is the 54th season of competitive association football in Australia.

National teams

Men's senior

Friendlies
The following is a list of friendlies (to be) played by the men's senior national team in 2022–23.

FIFA World Cup

Men's under-23

Friendlies

Men's under-20

Costa Cálida Supercup
Following the withdrawal from 2023 AFC U-20 Asian Cup qualification, the Young Socceroos participated in the Costa Cálida Supercup, a four nations tournament which took place in Spain.

AFC U-20 Asian Cup qualification

At the end of August, Football Australia withdrew the team from the tournament, citing safety reasons and travel advice. However, they were reinstated when Iraq lost hosting rights due to the 2021–2022 Iraqi political crisis, with the matches rescheduled and relocated to Kuwait City.

AFC U-20 Asian Cup

Men's under-17

Friendlies

AFF U-16 Youth Championship

AFC U-17 Asian Cup qualification

Women's senior

Friendlies
The following is a list of friendlies (to be) played by the women's senior national team in 2022–23.

Cup of Nations

Women's U-23

AFF Women's Championship

Women's under-20

Friendlies
The following is a list of friendlies (to be) played by the women's U20 national team in 2022–23.

FIFA U-20 Women's World Cup

Since the qualifying competition for the U-20 Women's World Cup was cancelled, the AFC nominated three teams based on the results of the 2019 AFC U-19 Women's Championship, with Japan, South Korea and North Korea qualifying. After the withdrawal of North Korea, it was announced that Australia would replace North Korea as the AFC’s representatives at the FIFA U-20 Women's World Cup. Australia were drawn into the same group as the hosts, for the official Opening Match of the competition.

AFC U-20 Women's Asian Cup qualification

Women's under-17

Friendlies
The following is a list of friendlies (to be) played by the women's U17 national team in 2022–23.

AFF Women's U-18 Championship

AFC U-17 Women's Asian Cup qualification

Domestic leagues

A-League Men

National Premier Leagues

There was no finals series for the third year in a row.

A-League Women

Domestic cups

Australia Cup

Deaths
 25 July 2022: Karen Harris, Australia, Elizabeth Downs, Campbelltown City, Renegades, and Modbury Vista full-back.
 21 August 2022: Peter Stone, 67, Australia, Western Suburbs, APIA Leichhardt, and St George midfielder.
 21 October 2022: Masato Kudo, 32, Japan and Brisbane Roar striker.
 10 November 2022: John Roche, 75, Australia, Sutherland Shire, and Marconi Fairfield defender.
 28 February 2023: Grant Turner, 64, New Zealand and South Melbourne striker.

Retirements
 19 July 2022: Tommy Oar, 30, former Australia, Brisbane Roar, Central Coast Mariners, and Macarthur midfielder.
 20 July 2022: James Meredith, 34, former Australia, Perth Glory, and Macarthur defender.
 3 October 2022: Matt Simon, 36, former Australia, Central Coast Mariners, and Sydney FC forward.
 19 October 2022: Ola Toivonen, 36, former Sweden and Melbourne Victory forward.
 10 January 2023: Yusuke Tanaka, 36, former Western Sydney Wanderers defender.
23 January 2023: Jem Karacan, 33, former Central Coast Mariners midfielder.
2 February 2023: Matthew Spiranovic, 34, former Australia, North Geelong Warriors, Melbourne Victory, Western Sydney Wanderers, and Perth Glory defender.
 18 March 2023: Ellie Brush, 34, former Australia, Canberra United, Western Sydney Wanderers, and Sydney FC defender.

Notes

References

External links
 Football Australia official website

2022 in Australian soccer
2023 in Australian soccer
Seasons in Australian soccer